Ryazantsev or Riazantsev is a Russian masculine surname, its feminine counterpart is Ryazantseva or Riazantseva. It may refer to

 Aleksandr Ryazantsev (born 1986), Russian footballer
 Alexander Riazantsev (ice hockey) (born 1980), Russian ice hockey player
 Alexander Riazantsev (chess player) (born 1985), Russian chess grandmaster
 Maksim Ryazantsev (born 1977), Russian football player
 Vladislav Ryazantsev (born 1986), Russian politician